Mimophis is a genus of snakes in the family Psammophiidae found in Madagascar. Prior to 2017, the genus comprised only a single species, Mimophis mahfalensis. A second species, Mimophis occultus, was described in 2017.

 Mimophis mahfalensis 
 Mimophis occultus

References 

Psammophiidae
Snake genera
Reptiles of Madagascar
Endemic fauna of Madagascar
Taxa named by Albert Günther